Jorge Arturo Mendoza Huertas (born 4 July 1971) is a Peruvian mental calculator.

In 2014 he set a new Guinness World Record by mentally adding a hundred single-digit numbers together in 18.23 seconds. At the 2006 Mental Calculation World Cup in Giessen, Germany, he finished in first position in the category 'Addition'.

References

External links 

Super Cerebros 2014

Chema a las 11

OLA KE ASE 2013

Mental calculators
1971 births
Living people